Letts is a city in northern Louisa County, Iowa, United States, established in 1855. The population was 363 at the time of the 2020 census. It is part of the Muscatine Micropolitan Statistical Area. The name is taken from that of local benefactor, Nehemiah Madison Letts (b. 1818 Licking, Ohio – d. 1894 Grandview, Iowa).

Geography
Letts is located one-half mile south of the Louisa-Muscatine county line and two miles west of US Route 61.

Demographics

2010 census
As of the census of 2010, there were 384 people, 148 households, and 110 families residing in the city. The racial makeup of the city was 94.8% White, 0.5% Native American, 1.8% Pacific Islander, 1.3% from other races, and 1.6% from two or more races. Hispanic or Latino of any race were 5.2% of the population.

There were 148 households, of which 37.2% had children under the age of 18 living with them, 56.8% were married couples living together, 14.9% had a female householder with no husband present, 2.7% had a male householder with no wife present, and 25.7% were non-families. 23.6% of all households were made up of individuals, and 11.5% had someone living alone who was 65 years of age or older. The average household size was 2.59 and the average family size was 3.05.

The median age in the city was 37.3 years. 26.6% of residents were under the age of 18; 8.3% were between the ages of 18 and 24; 22% were from 25 to 44; 28% were from 45 to 64; and 15.1% were 65 years of age or older. The gender makeup of the city was 51.0% male and 49.0% female.

2000 census
As of the census of 2000, there were 392 people, 146 households, and 113 families residing in the city. The racial makeup of the city was 96.68% White, 0.51% African American, 1.02% Native American, 0.26% Asian, 0.77% from other races, and 0.77% from two or more races. Hispanic or Latino of any race were 3.06% of the population.

There were 146 households, out of which 38.4% had children under the age of 18 living with them, 61.0% were married couples living together, 9.6% had a female householder with no husband present, and 22.6% were non-families. 17.8% of all households were made up of individuals, and 7.5% had someone living alone who was 65 years of age or older. The average household size was 2.68 and the average family size was 3.04.

In the city, the population was spread out, with 28.6% under the age of 18, 8.7% from 18 to 24, 26.0% from 25 to 44, 23.0% from 45 to 64, and 13.8% who were 65 years of age or older. The median age was 37 years. For every 100 females, there were 99.0 males. For every 100 females age 18 and over, there were 93.1 males.

The median income for a household in the city was $37,188, and the median income for a family was $40,750. Males had a median income of $32,500 versus $19,375 for females. The per capita income for the city was $17,285. About 4.4% of families and 7.1% of the population were below the poverty line, including 8.0% of those under age 18 and none of those age 65 or over.

Education
Louisa–Muscatine Community School District operates the area public schools for this municipality.

Some rural areas in proximity to Letts are zoned to the Muscatine Community School District. Muscatine High School is the district's high school.

External links
 

 Official website of the City of Letts
 Letts Library Website

References

Cities in Iowa
Cities in Louisa County, Iowa
Muscatine, Iowa micropolitan area